Eucalyptus oligantha, commonly known as the broad-leaved box, is a species of tree that is native to the Kimberley region of Western Australia and parts of the Northern Territory. It has rough, fibrous or flaky greyish bark, broadly egg-shaped to almost round adult leaves that are lost in the dry season, flower buds in groups of three or seven, creamy yellow to whitish flowers and cup-shaped to more or less cylindrical, bell-shaped or conical fruit.

Description
It has rough, fibrous, flaky or scaly greyish bark on the trunk and branches. Adult leaves are broadly egg-shaped to more or less round and are usually lost in the dry season. The flower buds are mostly arranged on the end of branchlets on a thin, branched peduncle in groups of three or seven. Flowering has been recorded in March, July and September and the flowers are creamy yellow to whitish.

Taxonomy and naming
Eucalyptus oligantha was first formally described in 1843 by Johannes Conrad Schauer in Walpers' Repertorium Botanices Systematicae. The specific epithet (oligantha) is from the ancient Greek oligos meaning "few" and -anthus meaning "-flowered".

Distribution and habitat
Broad-leaved box grows on flats and slopes, often near watercourses in forest and woodland in the Kimberley region between Wyndham and Derby with a few scattered populations in the Northern Territory, including some of its offshore islands.

Conservation status
This eucalypt is classified as "not threatened" by the Western Australian Government Department of Parks and Wildlife.

See also
List of Eucalyptus species

References

Eucalypts of Western Australia
Flora of the Northern Territory
Trees of Australia
oligantha
Myrtales of Australia
Plants described in 1843
Taxa named by Johannes Conrad Schauer